Amphitropesa is a genus of bristle flies in the family Tachinidae.

Species
Amphitropesa collessi Barraclough, 1992
Amphitropesa elegans Townsend, 1933

References

Dexiinae
Tachinidae genera
Taxa named by Charles Henry Tyler Townsend
Diptera of Australasia